Corruption Prevention and Combating Bureau (KNAB) is a specialised anti-corruption authority of Latvia. Its aim is to fight corruption in Latvia in a coordinated and comprehensive way through prevention, investigation and education. KNAB was established October 2002 and is fully operational since February 2003.

KNAB is an independent public administration institution under the supervision of the Cabinet of Ministers. The supervision is executed by the Prime Minister. It is limited to the control of lawfulness of decisions. KNAB is also a pre-trial investigatory body and has traditional police powers.

KNAB represents Latvia at the GRECO.

The current director of KNAB is Jēkabs Straume (appointed on June 15, 2017). The deputy director on corruption combating matters is Jānis Roze.

All executives
 Guntis Rutkis 2002—2003
 Rūdolfs Kalniņš (acting) 2003
 Alvis Vilks (acting) 2003
 Juta Strīķe (acting) 2003—2004
 Aleksejs Loskutovs 2004—2008
 Normunds Vilnītis 2009—2011
 Juta Strīķe (acting) 2011
 Jaroslavs Streļčenoks 2011—2016 17.November
 Ilze Jurča (acting) 2016—2017
 Jēkabs Straume 2017—present

Former executives
 Guntis Rutkis, director, 2002—2003
 Aleksejs Loskutovs, director, 2003–June 29, 2008
 Normunds Vilnitis, director, 2009–March 12, 2011 June 16
 Jaroslavs Streļčenoks, director, 2011–November 17., 2016–November 17.

References

External links
 

Law enforcement agencies of Latvia
Anti-corruption agencies